The National Theatre Bucharest is one of the national theatres of Romania, located in the capital city of Bucharest.

Founding
It was founded as the Teatrul cel Mare din București ("Grand Theatre of Bucharest") in 1852, its first director being Costache Caragiale. It became a national institution in 1864 by a decree of Prime Minister Mihail Kogălniceanu, and was officially named as the National Theatre in 1875; it is now administered by the Romanian Ministry of Culture.

In April 1836, the Societatea Filarmonica — a cultural society founded by Ion Heliade Rădulescu and Ion Câmpineanu — bought the Câmpinencii Inn to build a National Theatre on the site, and began to collect money and materials for this purpose. In 1840, Obşteasca Adunare (the legislative branch established under the terms of the Imperial Russian-approved Organic Statute) proposed to Alexandru II Ghica, the Prince of Wallachia, a project to build a National Theatre with state support. The request was approved on June 4, 1840. Prince Gheorghe Bibescu adopted the idea of founding the theatre and chose a new location, on the spot of the former Filaret Inn. There were several reasons to favor this location: it was centrally located, right in the middle of Podul Mogoşoaiei (today's Calea Victoriei); the earthquake of 1838 had damaged the inn beyond repair, and it needed to be torn down.

Old building

The August 13, 1843, report of the commission charged with building the theatre determined that construction would cost 20,300 florins (standard gold coin) of which only 13,000 gold coins were available. In 1846, a new commission engaged the Viennese architect A. Hefft, who came up with an acceptable plan.

Construction got under way in 1848, only to be interrupted in June by the Wallachian revolution. In August 1849, after Prince Barbu Dimitrie Ştirbei took power, he ordered that construction be completed.

The theatre was inaugurated on December 31, 1852, with the play Zoe sau Amantul împrumutat, described in the newspapers of the time as a "vaudeville with songs". The building was built in the baroque style, with 338 stalls on the main floor, three levels of loges, a luxurious foyer with staircases of Carrara marble and a large gallery in which students could attend free of charge. For its first two years, the theatre was lit with tallow lamps, but from 1854 it used rape oil lamps; still later this was replaced by gaslights and eventually electric lights. In 1875, at the time its name was changed to Teatrul Naţional, its director was the writer Alexandru Odobescu.

The historic theatre building on Calea Victoriei — now featured on the 100-leu banknote — was destroyed during the Luftwaffe bombardment of Bucharest on August 24, 1944 (see Bombing of Bucharest in World War II).

The modern theatre

The current National Theatre is located about half a kilometre away from the old site, just south of the Hotel Intercontinental at Piaţa Universităţii (University Square), and has been in use since 1973. The edifice was extensively renovated from 2012 to 2014.<ref> Sala Mare "The Grand Hall (Sala Mare) of National Theatre, Bucharest</ref>

Theatre activity
Currently, the Bucharest National Theatre presents its performances in seven auditoriums: Ion Caramitru Hall (940 seats), Small Hall (130-150 seats), Studio Hall (424-594 seats), Black Box Hall (200 seats), Painting Hall (230 seats), Media Hall (200 seats), and Amphitheatre (outdoor terrace) (299 seats).

In over 150 years of existence, the Bucharest National Theatre presented on stage many of the most significant pieces of universal dramaturgy. It has had successful performances both in and outside the country: France, Germany, Austria, Yugoslavia, Italy, England, Spain, Portugal, Greece, Brazil, etc.

Chairmen

 Costache Caragiale, Ioan A.Wachmann: 1852–1853, Costache Caragiale: 1853–1855
 Matei Millo: 1855–1859, 1861–1866, 1870–1871
 C. A. Rosetti: 1859–1860
 Direcția Comitetului Teatrelor: 1860–1861
 Costache Dimitriade: 1866–1867
 Matei Millo, Mihail Pascaly: 1867–1868
 Grigore Bengescu: 1868–1870
 Mihail Pascaly: 1871–1874, 1876–1877
 Societatea Dramatică: 1874–1875
 Al. Odobescu: 1875–1876
 Ion Ghica: 1877–1881
 Constantin Cornescu: 1881–1882
 Grigore C. Cantacuzino: 1882–1887, 1889–1898
 Constantin Stăncescu: 1887–1888
 Ion Luca Caragiale: 1888–1889
 Grigore C. Cantacuzino, Petre Grădişteanu: 1898–1899
 Scarlat Ghica: 1899–1901
 Ştefan Sihleanu: 1901–1905
 Alexandru Davila: 1905–1908
 Pompiliu Eliade: 1908–1911
 Ion Bacalbașa: 1911–1912
 A. Davila, I.A. Brătescu–Voinești, George Diamandi: 1912–1914
 George Diamandi: 1914–1915
 Alexandru Mavrodi: 1915–1916, 1922–1923, 1931–1933
 German occupation: 1917–1918
 Constantin Rădulescu-Motru, I. Peretz: 1918–1919
 Ion Peretz, Victor Eftimiu: 1919–1920
 Victor Eftimiu: 1920–1921
 Victor Eftimiu, Al. Mavrodi: 1921–1922
 Ion Valjan: 1923–1924
 Corneliu Moldovanu, Ion Minulescu: 1924–1925
 Corneliu Moldovanu, Al. Hodos: 1925–1927
 Corneliu Moldovanu: 1927–1928
 Corneliu Moldovanu, Liviu Rebreanu: 1928–1929
 Liviu Rebreanu, Victor Eftimiu: 1929–1930
 Ion Grigore Perieţeanu, Al. Mavrodi: 1930–1931
 Al. Mavrodi, Paul Prodan: 1933–1934
 Paul Prodan: 1934–1937
 Paul Prodan, Ion Marin Sadoveanu: 1937–1938
 Ion Marin Sadoveanu, Camil Petrescu: 1938–1939
 Camil Petrescu, Ion Marin Sadoveanu: 1939–1940
 Ion Marin Sadoveanu, Haig Acterian, Liviu Rebreanu: 1940–1941
 Liviu Rebreanu: 1941–1944
 Victor Eftimiu, Nicolae Carandino, Tudor Vianu: 1944–1945
 Ion Pas: 1945–1946
 Ion Pas, Zaharia Stancu: 1946–1947
 Zaharia Stancu: 1947–1952
 Ioan Popa: 1952–1953
 Vasile Moldoveanu: 1953–1956
 Ion Marin Sadoveanu: 1956–1959
 Zaharia Stancu: 1959–1969
 Radu Beligan: 1969–1990
 Andrei Şerban: 1990–1993
 Fănuş Neagu: 1993–1996
 Ion Cojar: 1996–2001
 Dinu Săraru: 2001–2004
 Ion Caramitru: 2005–2021

In 2005, following a contest, the actor Ion Caramitru was appointed as general director of the theatre.

See also
 List of concert halls

Notes

References

Constantin C. Giurescu,  ("History of Bucharest. From the oldest times to our days"), Ed. Pentru Literatură, Bucharest, 1966, p. 128, 141.
 This article draws heavily on the corresponding article in the :ro: Romanian Wikipedia, accessed 20 July 2006. Which, in turn cites:
George Potra, '' ("In Old Bucharest"), ed. Ştiinţifică şi Enciclopedică, Bucharest, 1981.

External links
 Official site

 
Theatres in Bucharest
Bucharest, National Theatre Bucharest
Modernist architecture in Romania
1852 establishments in Wallachia